The Eparchy of Buda ( or ) is a diocese or eparchy of the Serbian Orthodox Church, having jurisdiction over the territory of Hungary. The seat of the eparchy is in Szentendre ( or ) near Budapest.

Name
The term Buda ( or ) in the name of the eparchy refers to the name of the former city of Buda, which merged with the city of Pest to form the modern city of Budapest in 1873. That change did not affect the eparchy and the original name has been kept to the present day.

History

Early Christianity in Pannonia

Christianization of Slavs in Pannonia

Orthodox Christianity in Kingdom of Hungary

Serbian Eparchy of Buda under Turkish Rule

Serbian Eparchy of Buda under Habsburg Rule

Serbian Eparchy of Buda in Modern Hungary

Bishops
List of Serbian Orthodox Bishops of Buda:
 Archbishop Sava of Buda
 Metropolitan Sevastijan I
 Metropolitan Sevastijan II (†1662);
 Metropolitan Simeon (around 166?);
 Metropolitan Viktor (1660–1668 and 1680–1684);
 Bishop Kiril (1668–1680);
 Evtimije Popovic (1695–1700);
 Vikentije Popović-Hadžilavić (1708–1713);
 Mihailo Milosevic (bishop) (1716–1728);
 Vasilije Dimitrijevic (bishop) (1728–1748);
 Dionisije Novaković (1749–1767);
 Arsenije Radivojevic (1770–1774);
 Sofronije Kirilović (1774–1781);
 Stefan Stratimirović (1786–1790);
 Dionisije Popovic (1791–1828);
 Stefan Stanković (1829–1834);
 Justin Jovanovic (1834);
 Panteleimon Zivkovic (1836–1839);
 Platon Atanacković (1839–1851);
 Arsenije Stojković (1852–1892);
 Lukijan Bogdanović (1897–1908);
 Georgije Zubkovic (1913–1951);
 Hrizostom Vojinović (1951–1952);
 German Đorić (1952–1956);
 Arsenije Bradvarević (1960–1963);
 1963–1988 various administrators;
 Danilo Krstić (1988–2002, admin. 1984–1988);
  (2002–present).

Monasteries
 Serbian Orthodox Monastery of Grabovac (Grábóc)
 Orthodox Monastery of Serbian Kovin (Ráckeve)

Gallery

See also
Serbs in Hungary
History of Hungary

Notes

References

External links

  

Serbian Orthodox Church in Hungary
Serb communities in Hungary
Religious sees of the Serbian Orthodox Church